Sister Jean, BVM (born Jean Dolores Schmidt, August 21, 1919), is an American religious sister of the Sisters of Charity of the Blessed Virgin Mary and chaplain for the Loyola Ramblers men's basketball team of Loyola University Chicago.

Early life
Jean Dolores Schmidt was born on August 21, 1919, in San Francisco, California, and raised in the Eureka Valley neighborhood. She first considered becoming a nun while she was in third grade. As a student at St. Paul's High School, she played on the girls basketball team. After graduating from high school in 1937, she entered the Sisters of Charity of the Blessed Virgin Mary convent in Iowa. In 1941, by then a sister, she returned to teach in California. Sister Jean completed her B.A. at Mount St. Mary's College (now Mount St. Mary's University in Los Angeles) in 1949 and M.A. at Loyola University of Los Angeles (now Loyola Marymount University) in 1961.

Career
Sister Jean began teaching at St. Bernard School in Glassell Park, California and then in 1946 taught at St. Charles Borromeo School in North Hollywood, California.  Several students from her teaching days at St. Charles later entered religious life, including Cardinal Roger Mahoney, Fr. Thomas Rausch, S.J. and Sister Mary Milligan, RSHM. Sister Jean moved from California to teach at Mundelein College in Chicago in 1961. During the mid-1960s, she was active in the civil rights movement.
She was hired by Loyola in 1991 when Mundelein was merged into Loyola. She has worked as the team chaplain for the Ramblers men's basketball team since 1994. In 2016, she was presented with an honorary doctorate from Loyola. Providing a mix of spiritual and scouting support, Schmidt inspired her own bobblehead doll in 2011 and was honored with a "Sister Jean Day" on December 1, 2012.

Sister Jean gained overnight publicity beyond the Loyola community after the Ramblers' upset of Miami in the 2018 NCAA tournament. Her fame continued to grow after the team upset Tennessee in the round of 32, sending Loyola to their first Sweet 16 appearance in 33 years. The then-98-year-old nun quickly became a star in the tournament; her bobblehead sold for more than $300 on eBay. Loyola ultimately advanced to the Final Four for the first time since 1963, but they were defeated by Michigan in the semifinal game.

Sister Jean again drew national attention when Loyola appeared in the 2021 tournament. After reaching the round of 32 as an 8-seed, she incorporated a scouting report into her opening prayer for the game against the top-seeded Illinois Fighting Illini, a team she was reluctant to play against because she did not want to root against another team from the same home state. The Ramblers went on to upset the Illini, 71–58. She had initially been barred from appearing at the tournament but was later cleared after she received a COVID-19 vaccine.

Sister Jean turned 100 on August 21, 2019. She maintains an office in the student center on campus. As of 2020, she was living at The Clare, a senior living residence in downtown Chicago that describes itself as "reinventing the luxury retirement community." She made an appearance at the 2022 tournament after Loyola qualified for the tournament, with USA Today noting she was still in good health. On August 21, 2022, the plaza outside the Loyola CTA station was dedicated to Sister Jean in commemoration of her 103rd birthday.

References

External links
 Campus Ministry: Loyola University Chicago bio
 Sister Jean: Loyola University Chicago: Features from Loyola University Chicago's official website

1919 births
Living people
20th-century American Roman Catholic nuns
21st-century American Roman Catholic nuns
American centenarians
Catholics from California
Mount St. Mary's University (Los Angeles) alumni
Loyola Marymount University alumni
Loyola Ramblers men's basketball
Loyola University Chicago faculty
People from San Francisco
Women centenarians
American women academics